Serhiy Pitel (born 10 September 1995) is a Ukrainian professional football midfielder who plays with FC Continentals.

Club career

Ukraine
Pitel is the product of the FC Monolit Illichivsk, FC Azovstal Mariupol and FC Skala Stryi School Systems. In 2012, Pitel played for FC Skala-2 Morshyn at the Amateur level. During the 2012/13 season he was part of FC Skala Stryi, but did not play any match. He made his professional debut for FC Enerhiya Nova Kakhovka in a game against FC Real Pharma Odesa on 26 July 2014 in the Ukrainian Second League.

In Summer 2015, Pitel joined FC Hoverla Uzhhorod. He made his debut in the Ukrainian Premier League Reserves in a game against FC Shakhtar Donetsk on 31 July 2015. In 2018, he returned to the Ukrainian Second League to sign with Veres Rivne.

Canada 
In 2019, he played in the Canadian Soccer League with Kingsman SC. He featured in the quarterfinal match of the postseason for Kingsman SC B, where he contributed two goals in a 3-2 defeat to Hamilton City SC B. He returned to the CSL for the 2022 season when he signed with Continentals F.C.

Career statistics

References

External links
 Statistics at FFU website 
 Statistics at Ukrainian Premier League website
 

1995 births
Living people
Ukrainian footballers
FC Enerhiya Nova Kakhovka players
NK Veres Rivne players
Association football forwards
Canadian Soccer League (1998–present) players
Ukrainian Second League players
FC Continentals players